The perifocal coordinate (PQW) system is a frame of reference for an orbit. The frame is centered at the focus of the orbit, i.e. the celestial body about which the orbit is centered. The unit vectors  and  lie in the plane of the orbit.  is directed towards the periapsis of the orbit and  has a true anomaly of 90 degrees past the periapsis. The third unit vector   is the angular momentum vector and is directed orthogonal to the orbital plane such that:

And, since  is the angular momentum vector, it may also be expressed as:

where h is the specific relative angular momentum.

The position and velocity vectors can be determined for any location of the orbit. The position vector, r, can be expressed as:

where  is the true anomaly and the radius  may be calculated from the orbit equation.

The velocity vector, v, is found by taking the time derivative of the position vector:

A derivation from the orbit equation can be made to show that:

Conversion between coordinate systems
The perifocal coordinate system can also be defined using the orbital parameters inclination (i), right ascension of the ascending node and the argument of periapsis. The following equations convert from perifocal coordinates to equatorial coordinates and vice versa.

Perifocal to equatorial 

In most cases, .

Equatorial to perifocal

Applications
Perifocal reference frames are most commonly used with elliptical orbits for the reason that the  coordinate must be aligned with the eccentricity vector. Circular orbits, having no eccentricity, give no means by which to orient the coordinate system about the focus.

The perifocal coordinate system may also be used as an inertial frame of reference because the axes do not rotate relative to the fixed stars. This allows the inertia of any orbital bodies within this frame of reference to be calculated. This is useful when attempting to solve problems like the two-body problem.

References

Coordinate systems
Astrodynamics